The Dancer of Marrakesh (French: La danseuse de Marrakech) is a 1949 French drama film directed by Léon Mathot and starring Yves Vincent, Katia Lova and Aimé Clariond.

It was made at the Victorine Studios in Nice with sets designed by the art director Claude Bouxin.

Synopsis
A French officer serving in the French protectorate in Morocco falls in love with a native dancer in Marrakesh. A brother officer does his best to separate them.

Cast
 Yves Vincent as Jean Portal
 Katia Lova as Sonia 
 Habib Benglia as Taraor 
 Aimé Clariond as Barjac 
 Sirena Adgemova as Kalina 
 Roland Armontel as Le général 
 Lahcen Ben Idder Souissi
 Roger Bontemps as Bertin 
 Lucien Callamand as Le coiffeur
 Raphaël Patorni as Le colonel 
 Jacques Courtin as Un invité 
 Raymond Francky
 Philippe Hersent
 Jean-Pierre Lombard
 Gina Manès

References

Bibliography 
 Dayna Oscherwitz & MaryEllen Higgins. The A to Z of French Cinema. Scarecrow Press, 2009.

External links 
 

1949 films
1949 drama films
French drama films
1940s French-language films
Films directed by Léon Mathot
Films shot at Victorine Studios
French black-and-white films
1940s French films